Josh Herrin (born May 23, 1990), is an American professional motorcycle road racer who turned pro in 2006. He currently competes in the MotoAmerica Supersport Championship for the Warhorse HSBK Racing Ducati NYC team.

Racing history

Amateur career
Herrin was born in Glendale, California to Phil and Kim Herrin and is the older brother of professional stock car racing driver Zach Herrin. Josh turned professional in 2006 a year after winning a WERA 600 National Championship. Prior to winning the 2004 USGPRU 125 title at age 14, he had raced mini bikes and Yamaha YSR50s and was invited to compete in the World Mini GP Festival in Valencia, Spain.

Professional career
In 2006, Herrin raced a limited AMA Pro SuperSport season, but earned a podium finish at Miller Motorsports Park and took four additional top-10 finishes in the series at a young age of 16. In 2007, he raced in AMA Supersport Championship, achieving a win at the September race at Mazda Raceway Laguna Seca and two additional podium finishes.

2008 saw Herrin finishing fifth in the AMA Pro SuperSport standings with a victory at Barber Motorsports Park, three more podium finishes and a pole at California Speedway. He also led the most laps in the Daytona opener, before finishing second to teammate Ben Bostrom.

In 2009, Herrin finished second in the AMA Pro Daytona Sportbike Championship with four victories (a double at VIR and a double in New Jersey), five second-places and two third-places.

On March 5, 2010, Herrin won the historic Daytona 200. At 19 he became the second youngest rider to win the prestigious race. Brad Andres was 18 when he won the race in 1955.

Herrin raced with the Monster Energy Graves Motorsports Yamaha team from 2012 to 2013, winning the AMA Superbike Championship in 2013.

Moto2 World Championship
In 2013, Herrin announced he would be signing with the Caterham Air Asia team in the 2014 Moto 2 World Championship.

Career statistics

All-time statistics

Grand Prix motorcycle racing

By season

Races by year

References

External links

1990 births
Living people
American motorcycle racers
AMA Superbike Championship riders
Sportspeople from Glendale, California
Moto2 World Championship riders